Oliver Günther (born 22 October 1961 in Stuttgart) is president of the University of Potsdam and former president of the German Informatics Society (GI).

Education 
In 1979 and 1980, Günther was the winner of Germany's National Mathematics Competition. He holds a Diploma in Industrial Engineering from the University of Karlsruhe, and M.S. (1985) and Ph.D. degrees (1987) in Computer Science from the University of California at Berkeley.

Career
Before becoming assistant professor at the University of California in Santa Barbara in 1988, Günther worked as a post-doc at the International Computer Science Institute (ICSI). From 1989 till 1993 he held a leading position at FAW Ulm (Forschungsinstitut für anwendungsorientierte Wissensverarbeitung). From 1993 until 2011 Günther was Professor of Information Systems at Humboldt-Universität zu Berlin. From 2006 until 2011 he also served as Dean of Humboldt's School of Business and Economics. He was elected president of the University of Potsdam effective 2012. 

Günther has conducted research projects in the areas of enterprise information systems, IT strategy, security and privacy, digital asset management, collaborative software, database management, as well as geographic and environmental information systems. He has published broadly on these subjects and has been associate editor of numerous academic journals. He has held visiting faculty positions at the European School of Management and Technology in Berlin, the École Nationale Supérieure des Télécommunications and the Pôle universitaire Léonard-de-Vinci in Paris, the University of California at Berkeley, and the University of Cape Town.

Günther has served as a consultant and board member to various government agencies and high-tech companies. He was chairman of the board of Poptel AG, Germany's first voice-over-IP company, and chief technology officer of Teamtoolz, Inc., a San Francisco-based cloud service provider for the marketing and advertising industry. Commissioned by the German Ministry of the Interior, he currently coordinates the foundation of a business process library for the German public administration.

Honors

 2014 Doctor of Humane Letters honoris causa), American Jewish University, Los Angeles
 2018 Member, German Academy of Science and Engineering acatech
 2019 Fellow, German Informatics Society  (GI)

Memberships and honorary offices
 German Informatics Society (GI), member (since 1984), president (2012–2014)
 Association of Computer Science (ACM), member
Social Democratic Party of Germany, member (since 1985)
German Academic Scholarship Foundation, member of the selection committee
Moses Mendelssohn Center for European-Jewish Studies (MMZ), chairman of the board of trustees
Leibniz Centre for Contemporary History (ZZF), member of the board of trustees
Einstein Forum, member of the board of trustees
Leibniz Institute for Astrophysics (AIP), member of the board of trustees
UP Transfer, chairman of the supervisory board
Mitglied des Rotary-Clubs Berlin-Nord
FOM University of Applied Sciences for Economics and Management, member of the board of trustees
Stiftung Werner-von-Siemens-Ring, member of the foundation council
Voltaire Prize, jury member
Weizenbaum Institute, member of the board of trustees
Innovation Award Berlin Brandenburg, chairman of the jury
Urania Berlin, member of the board of trustees
German Rectors' Conference, Vice President for Governance, Teaching, and Learning
Business Development Bank of the State of Brandenburg (IBB), member of the advisory council
Atlantik-Brücke, member
proBrandenburg e.V., chairman of the board
German University Alliance UA11+ e.V., member of the board
German Society to Promote Research Transfer (GFFT), member of the board
Kommission for Research Data Management in Germany (KfID), member
Potsdam Citizen Foundation, member of the board

Selected works 

O. Günther, S. Evdokimov, M. Fischmann: Provable Security for Outsourcing Database Operations. International Journal of Information Security and Privacy, 4(1), 2010.
O. Günther, B. Fabian: Security Challenges of the EPC Network. Communications of the ACM 52(7), 2009.
O. Günther, W. Kletti, U. Kubach: RFID in manufacturing. Springer, Berlin 2008. .
O. Günther, S. Spiekermann: RFID and the Perception of Control: The Consumer’s View. Communications of the ACM 48(9):73-76, 2005.
O. Günther, B. Berendt, S. Spiekermann: Privacy in E-Commerce: Stated Preferences vs. Actual Behavior. Communications of the ACM 48(4):101-106, 2005.
O. Günther, V. Gaede: Multidimensional Access Methods. ACM Computing Surveys 30(2), 1998.
O. Günther: Environmental information systems. Springer, Berlin 1998. .
O. Günther (Ed.): Umweltanwendungen geographischer Informationssysteme. Wichmann, Karlsruhe 1992. .

External links 

Oliver Günther at University of Potsdam
List of Publications (PDF; 216 kB)
Former Ph.D. students (PDF; 57 kB)

References 

1961 births
Living people
Presidents of the German Informatics Society